Cesare Cipollini (born 16 December 1958) is an Italian former cyclist. He competed in the team pursuit event at the 1976 Summer Olympics. He is the brother of Mario Cipollini.

References

External links
 

1958 births
Living people
Italian male cyclists
Olympic cyclists of Italy
Cyclists at the 1976 Summer Olympics
Sportspeople from Belfort
Sportspeople from Lucca
Cyclists from Tuscany
Cyclists from Bourgogne-Franche-Comté